Rakesh Prabhu is an Indian cricketer. He made his Twenty20 debut for Mumbai in the 2016–17 Inter State Twenty-20 Tournament on 29 January 2017.

References

External links
 

Year of birth missing (living people)
Living people
Indian cricketers
Mumbai cricketers
Place of birth missing (living people)